This article lists the squads and players who competed in the 1998 European Women's Handball Championship played in Netherlands.

Austria 

 Ausra Fridrikas
 Barbara Strass
 Doris Meltzer
 Edith Mika
 Iris Morhammer
 Laura Fritz
 Natalia Rusnatschenko
 Renata Cieloch
 Rima Sypkuviene
 Stanka Bozovic
 Stephanie Ofenböck
 Tanja Dshandshagava
 Tanja Logvin

Denmark 

 Anette Hoffmann Moberg
 Camilla Andersen
 Christina Roslyng Hansen
 Gitte Sunesen
 Helle Simonsen
 Janne Johannesen Kolling
 Karen Brödsgaard
 Karina Jespersen
 Katrine Fruelund
 Kristine Andersen
 Lene Rantala
 Lotte Kiaerskou
 Mette Vestergaard Larsen
 Susanne Munk Lauritsen
 Tonje Kjaergaard

Germany 

 Agnieszka Tobiasz
 Anke Schulz
 Birte Tesch
 Christine Lindemann
 Emilia Luca
 Franziska Heinz
 Heike Schmidt
 Kathrin Blacha
 Melanie Schliecker
 Michaela Erler
 Michaela Schanze
 Nikola Pietzsch
 Romy Reincke
 Silke Christiansen
 Silvia Schmidt
 Yvonne Karrasch

Hungary 

 Ágnes Farkas
 Andrea Farkas
 Anikó Kántor
 Anikó Nagy
 Anita Kulcsár
 Beáta Siti
 Beatrix Balogh
 Beatrix Kökény
 Gabriella Takács
 Helga Németh
 Ildikó Pádár
 Judit Zsemberyné Simics
 Katalin Pálinger
 Krisztina Pigniczki
 Rita Deli

Macedonia 

 Anzela Platon
 Biljana Naumoska
 Biljana Risteska
 Gordana Naceva
 Julijana Crvenkovska
 Klara Boeva
 Larisa Kiseleva
 Marina Abramova
 Mirjana Cupic
 Oksana Maslova
 Olgica Todorovska
 Valentina Radulovic

Netherlands 

 Adriana Krijnen
 Diane Lamein
 Diane Ordelmans
 Elly an de Boer
 Heidi Veltmaat
 Laura Robben
 Marieke van Linder
 Marlie Menten
 Natasa Burgers
 Nicole Heuwkemeijer
 Olga Assink
 Renate Erkelens
 Wilhelmina Feijen

Norway 

 Ann Cathrin Eriksen
 Camilla Carstens
 Cecilie Leganger
 Elisabeth Hilmo
 Elise Alsand
 Else-Marte Sörlie
 Heidi Tjugum
 Janne Tuven
 Jeanette Nielsen
 Kjersti Grini
 Mette Davidsen
 Mia Hundvin
 Sara Hausmann
 Siv Heim Saeboe
 Tonje Larsen
 Trine Haltvik

Romania 

 Alina Dobrin
 Anamaria Stetz
 Carmen Amariei
 Cristina Dogaru
 Cristina Mihai
 Luminita Hutupan
 Maria Iorgu
 Maria Radoi
 Marinela Patru
 Mihaela Bobocea
 Narcisa Paunica
 Ramona Mihalache
 Simona Gogirla
 Simona Stanciu
 Steluta Luca
 Victorina Bora

Poland 

 Agnieszka Matuszweska
 Agnieszka Truszynska
 Anna Ejsmont
 Dagmara Kot
 Ewa Jarzyna
 Iwona Blaszkowska
 Iwona Lacz
 Iwona Nabozna
 Iwona Pabich
 Justyna Sebrala
 Malgorzata Jedrzejczak
 Monika Studzinska
 Renata Zukiel
 Sabina Soja

Russia 

 Ekaterina Koulaguina
 Elena Chatalova
 Elena Tchaoussova
 Inna Suslina
 Irina Kalinitchenko
 Liudmila Shevchenko
 Maria Sidorova
 Natalia Deriouguina
 Natalia Gontcharova
 Nigina Saidova
 Olga Tchetchkova
 Raissa Verakso
 Svetlana Mozgovaya
 Svetlana Smirnova

Spain 

 Aitziber Elejaga Vargas
 Amaia Ugartemendia
 Ana Isabel Ruiz Perez
 Begona Sanchez Santos
 Consuelo Benvent Aparici
 Cristina Gomez Arquer
 Cristina Lopez Quiros
 Eider Rubio Ponce
 Elena Ciubotaru Turcu
 Elisabeth Lopez Valledor
 Gemma Lujan Suarz
 Lidia Sanchez Alias
 Montserrat Puche Díaz
 Natalia Morskova
 Susana Pareja Ibarra
 Teresa Andreu Rodriguez

Ukraine 

 Halyna Markushevska
 Laryssa Kovaleva
 Laryssa Kharlaniuk
 Maryna Verhelyuk
 Maya Karbunar
 Nataliya Datchenko
 Nataliya Derepasko
 Nataliya Mytryuk
 Nataliya Sen
 Olena Tsyhytsia
 Olena Yatsenko
 Oxana Sakada
 Tetjana Novikova
 Tetyana Vorozhtsova
 Valentyna Ivanko
 Viktoriya Khachatryan

References

External links 
 

European Handball Championship squads